The Cheese Mites (1903) is a British short silent documentary film, produced by Charles Urban and directed by F. Martin Duncan.

Plot
A gentleman is put off his lunch when he holds up a magnifying glass and sees a microscopic view of the cheese mites in his Stilton cheese sandwich.

Production background
The film "was the sensation of the first public programme of scientific films in Britain shown at the Alhambra Music Hall in Leicester Square, London, in August 1903". According to Michael Brooke of BFI Screenonline, "its claim to being scientific lay in its being shot through a microscope, revealing to a lay audience sights that would normally only have been available to owners of microscopes."

Preservation status
A complete copy which includes an opening sequence, featuring F. Martin Duncan as the gentleman, was recently discovered uploaded to YouTube under a different title, and has now been acquired by the British Film Institute. Previously only the sequence showing the cheese mites was known to have survived.

References

External links

 

1903 films
British short documentary films
British black-and-white films
British silent short films
1900s short documentary films
Black-and-white documentary films
Documentary films about science
Documentary films about food and drink
Microscopy
Films about arthropods